Stadion Alexanderstraße is a stadium in Oldenburg, Germany. It is used for football matches and is the home ground of VfL Oldenburg.

References

Football venues in Germany
Sport in Oldenburg (city)
Sports venues in Lower Saxony
VfL Oldenburg